Nymphicula hampsoni is a moth in the family Crambidae. It was described by David John Lawrence Agassiz in 2014. It is found in Australia, where it has been recorded from Queensland.

The wingspan is 15–16 mm. The base of the forewing is dark brown with a white antemedian band. The medial area is white. There are two parallel brown lines before the yellow-orange terminal area. The base of the hindwings is brown with a white subbasal band and a brown antemedian band.

Etymology
The species is named in honour of Sir George Hampson.

References

Nymphicula
Moths described in 2014